The Battle of Petsamo was fought between Finnish and Soviet troops in the area of Petsamo in the far north of Finland in 1939 and 1940. The Finnish troops were greatly outnumbered but managed to contain the Soviet troops due to the extreme terrain, weather and leadership.

Order of battle

Finland
The Finnish troops consisted of the 10th Separate Company (10.Er.K) in Parkkina and the 5th Separate Battery (5.Er.Ptri, four 76 mm field cannons, from year 1887) in Liinahamari. The separate companies and batteries didn't belong to any specific division of the Finnish Army and could be placed in ad hoc formations. The troops were part of the Lapland Group (Lapin Ryhmä) of the Finnish Army which had its headquarters at Rovaniemi. The troops were later reinforced with the 11th Separate Company and a 3rd Company which wasn't part of the original mobilization plans. Also the small Reconnaissance Detachment 11 (Tiedusteluosasto 11) was added to the troops. All the troops were called Detachment Pennanen (Osasto Pennanen, totalling under 900 men) after their commander captain Antti Pennanen.

Soviet Union
The Soviet Union had the 14th Army in the Kola Peninsula. The army consisted of three divisions, the 104th, 52nd and the 14th, operational power totalling ca. 52,500 men. Only the 104th and 52nd Divisions took part in the field operations in Petsamo, 14th occupying Liinahamari harbour. The Soviets had an overwhelming superiority in troops in the area, but most Soviet troops were preparing to fight against a possible British-French landing near Murmansk and were not involved in the fight against Finland.

The battle
Elements of the 104th Division crossed the border on 30 November 1939 and occupied the Finnish part of the Rybachi Peninsula. The 242nd Infantry Regiment of the 104th Division reached Parkkina on 1 December. The Finnish troops withdrew to Luostari. The 52nd Division was moved to Petsamo by boat. The 52nd took over the attack from the 104th and pushed back Detachment Pennanen all the way to Höyhenjärvi until the attack was halted on 18 December. During the following two months the Soviet forces stood still. During this time the Finnish troops made several reconnaissance and guerilla raids behind enemy lines. After the two-month pause the Soviet advance continued and this time attacks on 25 February forced the Finnish troops to Nautsi near Lake Inari. Here the troops stayed until the end of the war.

The Peace
In the Moscow Peace Treaty, Finland was forced to cede parts of her territory to the Soviet Union. Among these areas was the Finnish part of the Rybachy Peninsula (Kalastajasaarento/Fiskarhalvön) in the extreme north of Petsamo. The Soviet Union would take the whole Petsamo area after the Continuation War.

See also
Operation Platinfuchs
List of Finnish military equipment of World War II
List of Soviet Union military equipment of World War II

1939 in Finland
1940 in Finland
Conflicts in 1939
Petsamo 1939